Ongole railway station (station code: OGL) located in the Indian state of Andhra Pradesh, serves Ongole in Prakasam district. It is administered under Vijayawada railway division of South Coast Railway zone (formerly South Central Railway zone).

History 
The Vijayawada–Chennai link was established in 1899.

The Chirala–Elavur section was electrified in 1980–81.

Classification 
In terms of earnings and outward passengers handled, Ongole is categorized as a Non-Suburban Grade-3 (NSG-3) railway station. Based on the re–categorization of Indian Railway stations for the period of 2017–18 and 2022–23, an NSG–3 category station earns between – crore and handles  passengers.

Station amenities 

It is one of the 38 stations in the division to be equipped with Automatic Ticket Vending Machines (ATVMs). The Railway station recently got escalator for the convenience of passengers in the first platform. For the convenience of passengers two lifts were installed and recently made operational.

References

External links 

 Trains at Ongole

Railway stations in Prakasam district
Vijayawada railway division
Railway stations in India opened in 1899
Ongole